Edward Franklin Clancy  (born 12 March 1985) is a British former professional track and road bicycle racer, who competed between 2004 and 2021.

During his career, Clancy won four medals (three gold, one bronze) at the Summer Olympic Games, twelve medals (six gold, five silver and one bronze) at the UCI Track Cycling World Championships, seven medals (five gold, two bronze) at the UEC European Track Championships, as well as a silver medal at the 2014 Commonwealth Games. He also was part of eight world record times in the team pursuit, and was appointed a Member of the Order of the British Empire (MBE) in the 2009 New Year Honours, and an Officer of the Order of the British Empire (OBE) in the 2017 New Year Honours for services to cycling.

Career
On 17 August 2008, Clancy was a member of the Olympic team pursuit squad which broke the world record in the heats with 3:55.202, beating Russia to the ride-off for silver and gold. The next day, on their way to winning the gold medal, the British team broke their own world record in 3:53.314, beating Denmark by 6.7 seconds.

On 4 April 2012, Clancy was part of the Great Britain team which set a new world record of 3:53.295 in winning the gold medal in the team pursuit at the 2012 World Track Cycling Championships in Melbourne.

After the 2012 Olympic Games, where he set a time of 1:00.981 in the Omnium Kilo Time Trial, British Cycling announced that Clancy would replace Sir Chris Hoy in the Great Britain team for the team sprint event, where he rode in the Man 3 position. Despite finishing 2nd in the Glasgow round of the World Cup, Clancy returned to the endurance team for the 2013 World Championships.

In August 2021, during the delayed 2020 Summer Olympics, Clancy announced his retirement. His final competition was the 2021 UCI Track Champions League, which concluded in December of that year with a double header at the Lee Valley VeloPark.

In February 2023 Clancy was announced as the new active travel commissioner for South Yorkshire, following Dame Sarah Storey and working for South Yorkshire Mayor Oliver Coppard.

Personal life
He lives in Holmfirth, West Yorkshire.

Career achievements

Major results

Track

2004
 National Track Championships
2nd Madison (with Mark Cavendish)
2nd Team pursuit
2005
 1st  Team pursuit, UCI Track World Championships
 1st  Team pursuit, National Track Championships
 2004–05 UCI Track Cycling World Cup Classics, Sydney
2nd  Individual pursuit
2nd  Team pursuit
2006
 1st  Team pursuit, UEC European Under-23 Track Championships
 1st  Team pursuit, 2006–07 UCI Track Cycling World Cup Classics, Moscow
 1st  Team pursuit, National Track Championships
 3rd  Team pursuit, 2005–06 UCI Track Cycling World Cup Classics, Sydney
2007
 1st  Team pursuit, UCI Track World Championships
 1st  Team pursuit, 2006–07 UCI Track Cycling World Cup Classics, Manchester
 Team pursuit, 2007–08 UCI Track Cycling World Cup Classics
1st  Sydney
1st  Beijing
 National Track Championships
2nd Individual pursuit
2nd Kilo
2008
 1st  Team pursuit, Olympic Games
 1st  Team pursuit, UCI Track World Championships
 1st  Team pursuit, 2007–08 UCI Track Cycling World Cup Classics, Copenhagen
 2008–09 UCI Track Cycling World Cup Classics, Manchester
1st  Individual pursuit
1st  Team pursuit
2009
 1st  Team pursuit, 2008–09 UCI Track Cycling World Cup Classics, Copenhagen
 Team pursuit, 2009–10 UCI Track Cycling World Cup Classics
1st  Manchester
2nd  Melbourne
 2nd Kilo, National Track Championships
2010
 UCI Track World Championships
1st  Omnium
2nd  Team pursuit
 1st  Team pursuit, UEC European Track Championships
 2010–11 UCI Track Cycling World Cup Classics
1st  Omnium, Cali
3rd  Omnium, Melbourne
3rd  Team pursuit, Melbourne
2011
 UEC European Track Championships
1st  Omnium
1st  Team pursuit
 1st  Team pursuit, 2010–11 UCI Track Cycling World Cup Classics, Manchester
 3rd  Team pursuit, UCI Track World Championships
2012
 Olympic Games
1st  Team pursuit
3rd  Omnium
 1st  Team pursuit, UCI Track World Championships
 2nd  Team pursuit, 2011–12 UCI Track Cycling World Cup, London
 2nd  Team sprint, 2012–13 UCI Track Cycling World Cup, Glasgow
2013
 1st  Team pursuit, UEC European Track Championships
 1st  Team pursuit, 2013–14 UCI Track Cycling World Cup, Manchester
 National Track Championships
1st  Individual pursuit
1st  Points race
2nd Kilo
2nd Scratch
 2nd  Team pursuit, UCI Track World Championships
2014
 UEC European Track Championships
1st  Team pursuit
3rd  Scratch
 2nd  Team pursuit, Commonwealth Games
 3rd Omnium, Fenioux Piste International
2015
 2nd  Team pursuit, UCI Track World Championships
2016
 1st  Team pursuit, Olympic Games
 2nd  Team pursuit, UCI Track World Championships
2017
 1st  Team pursuit, 2017–18 UCI Track Cycling World Cup, Manchester
2018
 1st  Team pursuit, UCI Track World Championships
 Team pursuit, 2018–19 UCI Track Cycling World Cup
2nd  Saint-Quentin-en-Yvelines
3rd  Milton
2019
 2nd  Team pursuit, UCI Track World Championships
 3rd  Team pursuit, UEC European Track Championships

Road

2005
 4th Overall Tour de Berlin
1st Stage 1
2006
 10th Overall Tour de Berlin
2007
 2nd National Criterium Championships
2009
 1st Eddy Soens Memorial Road Race
 1st Round 6 – Southport, Tour Series
2010
 1st  National Criterium Championships
2011
 1st Round 2 – Aberystwyth, Tour Series
 1st Stage 5 Tour de Korea
2012
 1st Round 6 – Peterborough, Tour Series
2013
 Tour Series
1st Round 4 – Aberystwyth
1st Round 5 – Torquay
1st Round 9 – Woking
2015
 Tour Series
1st Round 3 – Aberystwyth
1st Round 9 – Peterborough
 1st London Nocturne
 3rd Milk Race
2018
 1st London Nocturne
 1st Prologue Herald Sun Tour

World records

See also
2012 Summer Olympics and Paralympics gold post boxes

References

External links

Motorpoint Pro-Cycling 2010

Ed Clancy Rider Profile – Cycling Weekly
Team halfords bikehut Ed Clancy's 09 team

1985 births
Living people
British male cyclists
English male cyclists
Cyclists at the 2008 Summer Olympics
Cyclists at the 2012 Summer Olympics
Cyclists at the 2016 Summer Olympics
Cyclists at the 2020 Summer Olympics
Olympic cyclists of Great Britain
Olympic gold medallists for Great Britain
Sportspeople from Barnsley
Officers of the Order of the British Empire
English Olympic medallists
Olympic medalists in cycling
Olympic bronze medallists for Great Britain
UCI Track Cycling World Champions (men)
Medalists at the 2012 Summer Olympics
Medalists at the 2008 Summer Olympics
Medalists at the 2016 Summer Olympics
Cyclists from Yorkshire
Cyclists at the 2014 Commonwealth Games
Commonwealth Games silver medallists for England
Commonwealth Games medallists in cycling
English track cyclists
Medallists at the 2014 Commonwealth Games